Karly-Marina Loaiza (born July 17, 1994), known professionally as Kali Uchis, is a Colombian-American singer and songwriter. She released her debut mixtape, Drunken Babble, in 2012, which was followed by her debut EP, Por Vida, released in 2015. In 2018, Uchis released her debut studio album Isolation to widespread acclaim. Uchis's second studio album and her first Spanish language project, Sin Miedo (del Amor y Otros Demonios), was released in 2021. The album spawned the single "Telepatía", which became Uchis' first solo charting hit on the US Billboard Hot 100. Her third studio album, Red Moon in Venus, was released in 2023 and it became her first album to debut within the top ten on the Billboard 200.

Uchis has won a Grammy Award for Best Dance Recording for her feature on Kaytranada's single "10%". Her other accolades include an American Music Award, two Billboard Music Awards, and a nomination for a Latin Grammy Award.

Early life

Karly-Marina Loaiza was born on July 17, 1994, in Alexandria, Virginia. Her father moved from Pereira, Colombia, to the United States, where he met Karly's mother during the late 1980s. Her mother had children from a previous marriage and is from Virginia. Loaiza is their only child together. Her father moved back to Colombia when Loaiza was in high school in order to take care of his mother, who had fallen ill. Loaiza stayed in Colombia with her father, uncles, and aunts during the summer. During the school year she would be with her mother and older siblings.

In high school, Loaiza learned to play piano and saxophone. She participated in a jazz band, before her graduation from T. C. Williams High School (renamed Alexandria City High School). She often skipped classes to spend time at the photo lab, making experimental short films. Her interest in photography led to her creating mixtape cover art. Skipping class and breaking the curfew set by her parents led to her being kicked out of her home. During this time, she lived in her car and wrote songs on her keyboard which would later come in the form of her lo-fi mixtape, Drunken Babble. She also wrote poetry, songs and music, but did not initially intend to sing, being rather more interested in directing films than being in the spotlight. She was given the nickname "Kali Uchis" by her father.

Career

2012–2016: Drunken Babble and Por Vida
Shortly after graduating, Uchis released her debut mixtape, Drunken Babble, on August 1, 2012. The mixtape was described as "genre-defying", noted for its influences from doo-wop, reggae and early 2000s R&B. In 2014, she collaborated with rapper Snoop Dogg on the song "On Edge" for his mixtape, That's My Work 3.

In February 2015, Uchis released her debut EP Por Vida for free download on her official website, and later on iTunes. The project featured production from various musicians, including Diplo, Tyler, the Creator, Kaytranada and BadBadNotGood. She embarked on her first tour during October 2015 with Leon Bridges, touring through the United States and parts of Canada.

2017–2018: Breakthrough with Isolation

In April 2017 the 5th studio album by Gorillaz, Humanz, was released and included songs featuring Uchis — namely "She's My Collar"; "Ticker Tape" – a bonus track from the album's Deluxe Edition; and "She's My Collar (Kali Uchis Spanish Special)" – a bonus track from the album's Super Deluxe Edition. The following month, Uchis released "Tyrant", featuring English singer Jorja Smith, to serve as the lead single from her then-upcoming debut studio album. In June 2017, she announced her first headlining tour, specifically a North American tour in support of the album. The tour took place from August to October 2017, starting at the Outside Lands Music and Arts Festival in San Francisco, with a stop at the Pop Montreal music festival. Uchis then released "Nuestro Planeta", featuring Reykon, as the second single from the album, on August 25, 2017. In October 2017, Uchis was nominated for a Latin Grammy Award for Record of the Year for "El Ratico", her collaboration with Colombian musician Juanes. She was also nominated for a Grammy Award for Best R&B Performance at the 60th Annual Grammy Awards for "Get You", her collaboration with Canadian singer Daniel Caesar.

Uchis supported Lana Del Rey on select North American arena dates of her world tour, the LA to the Moon Tour, from January 15 to February 16, 2018. "After the Storm", a track featuring Tyler, the Creator and Bootsy Collins, was issued as the third single in January 2018, followed by the announcement of Isolation, in March 2018, which took place during Uchis' appearance on The Tonight Show. Isolation was officially released worldwide on April 6, 2018. It received widespread acclaim from critics. At Metacritic, which assigns a normalized rating out of 100 to reviews from mainstream publications, the album received an average score of 87, based on 17 reviews. The album's fourth and final single, "Just a Stranger", featuring Steve Lacy, was released on October 30, 2018.

2019–2021: To Feel Alive and Sin Miedo (del Amor y Otros Demonios)
In June 2019, Uchis collaborated with American R&B band Free Nationals and American rapper Mac Miller on the single "Time", which was the first official posthumous release by Miller since his death on September 7, 2018. In December 2019, Uchis released "Solita", originally planned to be the lead single of her upcoming second studio album, it was later excluded from the final tracklist. However, the song would be included as a bonus track on the vinyl release of the album. On December 9, 2019, Kali Uchis was featured on the single "10%" by Canadian producer Kaytranada, which was taken from his album Bubba. The song would go onto win a Grammy Award for Best Dance Recording at the 63rd Annual Grammy Awards. Later on, Uchis was featured on Little Dragon's 6th studio album, New Me, Same Us for a remix of the song, "Are You Feeling Sad?". April 24, 2020, Uchis released an extended play titled To Feel Alive. The EP was recorded entirely in isolation due to the COVID-19 pandemic.

On August 7, 2020, Uchis released the song "Aquí Yo Mando" alongside American rapper Rico Nasty. The song was previously previewed in an episode of the HBO series Insecure. "Aquí Yo Mando" serves as the lead single from Uchis' second studio album, Sin Miedo (del Amor y Otros Demonios), which is her first project predominantly sung in Spanish. "La Luz" with Jhay Cortez was released as the album's second single on October 1, 2020. Later that month, a music video for the song was released on October 26. On November 6, the album's pre order was released, with the track list later being revealed on November 13. On November 17, "Te Pongo Mal (Préndelo)" with Jowell & Randy, was released as the album's sole promotional single. The album was released on November 18, 2020, and would peak at number 1 on the Billboard Top Latin Albums Chart.

Following a lip-sync challenge on the platform TikTok, "Telepatía" from Uchis' second studio album saw a surge in popularity in early 2021. Before being issued as a single, the song debuted inside the top 10 of Billboard's Hot Latin Songs chart and later reached the summit of the chart on the week of May 22, 2021. The song also reached number 3 on Spotify's US Top 50 and number 2 on the service's Global Top 50. "Telepatía" peaked at number 25 on the Billboard Hot 100. Following the resurgence of the song, the success garnered Sin Miedo (del Amor y Otros Demonios) to chart on the Billboard 200, peaking at number 52. On June 18, 2021, rapper and boyfriend Don Toliver released a collaboration with Uchis titled "Drugs N Hella Melodies", which was issued as the second single from Toliver's second studio album, Life of a Don. On September 29, 2021, Uchis released the single "Fue Mejor" with SZA. The song is featured as a bonus track on the deluxe edition of Sin Miedo (del Amor y Otros Demonios).

2022–present: Red Moon in Venus 
On April 21, 2022, Uchis announced on the red carpet of the Latin American Music Awards that she has completed her third and fourth studio albums, with one in Spanish and one in English. On August 15, 2022, she shared a snippet of a house-influenced song titled "No Hay Ley" on her social media, which was released as a single on September 2, 2022.

On January 19, 2023, Uchis released the song "I Wish you Roses", alongside a music video, as the first single for her upcoming album. On January 23, 2023, Uchis announced her third studio album Red Moon in Venus, which was released on March 3, 2023, with an accompanying tour featuring special guest RAYE. The tour is to begin on April 25, 2023 in Austin, Texas and conclude on May 30, 2023 in Phoenix, Arizona. On February 15, 2023, rapper and partner Don Toliver released a collaboration with Uchis titled "4 Me", a single for Toliver's studio album Love Sick. On February 24, 2023, Uchis released the song "Moonlight" as the second single for Red Moon in Venus, featuring production credits from Benny Blanco, Cashmere Cat, and Leon Michels. Red Moon in Venus was released on March 3, 2023, featuring guest appearances from Omar Apollo, Don Toliver, and Summer Walker.

Artistry

Influences
Uchis stated that she is influenced by music of the 1960s, with its mix of early soul, R&B and doo-wop, saying: "Musically and aesthetically, the culture of it just inspires me." She also mentioned that she enjoys jazz, stating during her career beginnings that she draws musical inspiration from Ella Fitzgerald and Billie Holiday. Other musicians she cited as influences on her sound are Curtis Mayfield, Loose Ends, Ralfi Pagan, and Irma Thomas. She also takes influences from Celia Cruz, Salma Hayek, La Lupe, Selena, Shakira and Ivy Queen. Uchis also admires singer Mariah Carey.

Discography

 Isolation (2018)
 Sin Miedo (del Amor y Otros Demonios) (2020)
 Red Moon in Venus (2023)

Accolades

References

External links
 
 

1994 births
Living people
21st-century American women singers
21st-century American singers
21st-century Colombian women singers
American women pop singers
American women singer-songwriters
American neo soul singers
American people of Colombian descent
American people of Spanish descent
Bisexual musicians
Bisexual women
Grammy Award winners
LGBT Hispanic and Latino American people
LGBT people in Latin music
LGBT people from Virginia
American LGBT singers
Musicians from Alexandria, Virginia
Singer-songwriters from Virginia
Spanish-language singers of the United States
T. C. Williams High School alumni
Women in Latin music